The 1932 Middle Tennessee State Teachers football team represented the Middle Tennessee State Teachers College (now known as Middle Tennessee State University) as a member of the Southern Intercollegiate Athletic Association (SIAA) during the 1932 college football season. Led by Frank Faulkinberry in his seventh and final season as head coach, Middle Tennessee State Teachers compiled an overall record of 4–6 with a mark of 2–3 in conference play. The team's captain was Luther Smith.

Schedule

References

Middle Tennessee State Teachers
Middle Tennessee Blue Raiders football seasons
Middle Tennessee State Teachers football